Strangers on Honeymoon is a 1936 British comedy film directed by Albert de Courville and starring Constance Cummings, Hugh Sinclair and Noah Beery, based on the 1926 novel The Northing Tramp by Edgar Wallace. Much of the film takes place in Canada. It was made by Gainsborough Pictures at the Lime Grove Studios in Shepherd's Bush. The film's sets were designed by the art director Ernö Metzner. Wallace's son (Bryan Edgar Wallace) also contributed to the film's screenplay, along with 5 other writers.

Plot
Young orphan October (Constance Cummings) flees from an arranged marriage with Wilfred (James Arnold), to wed gentleman tramp Quigley (Hugh Sinclair) for a bet. However, Quigley is secretly an English nobleman on the run for a murder he did not commit. Events escalate when a cousin of the jilted Wilfred hires a pair of hoodlums (Noah Beery & David Burns) to bump off Quigley.

Cast
 Constance Cummings as October Jones 
 Hugh Sinclair as Elliott Quigley  
 Noah Beery as Redbeard  
 Beatrix Lehmann as Elfrida Valentine  
 David Burns as Lennie  
 Butler Hixon as Sam Wasser  
 Maurice Freeman as Uncle Elmer Crinklaw 
 James Arnold as Wilfred H. Thompson, the Bridegroom  
 Tucker McGuire as Bride  
 Edmund Breon as Sir Gregory Andrews
 Skelton Knaggs
 Conway Palmer 
 Percy Parsons as Minister (uncredited)
 Sara Allgood as Housekeeper (uncredited) 
 Edmon Ryan

References

Bibliography
 Low, Rachael. Filmmaking in 1930s Britain. George Allen & Unwin, 1985.
 Wood, Linda. British Films, 1927-1939. British Film Institute, 1986.

External links

1936 films
Films directed by Albert de Courville
1936 comedy films
British comedy films
Films shot at Lime Grove Studios
Gainsborough Pictures films
Films set in Canada
British black-and-white films
Films scored by Jack Beaver
1930s English-language films
1930s British films